The United Arab Emirates men's national under-18 basketball team is administered by the United Arab Emirates Basketball Association.

References

External links
 Archived records of United Arab Emirates team participations

Men's national under-18 basketball teams
U-18